Sir Trevor Edwin Chinn  (born 24 July 1935) is a British businessman, philanthropist, and political activist.

Business career

Chinn was educated at Clifton College and King's College, Cambridge and started his career at Lex Garages (later Lex Service plc) where he followed in his father Rosser's footsteps, ascending to the role of managing director in 1968 at the age of 33 and to chairman and Chief Executive in 1973. In 1968 Lex made £1m in profits, but by the time he retired in 2003 the profits were over £85m. His most notable achievement at Lex was the acquisition of the RAC in 1999 for £425m, which completely changed the nature of the company and led to its change of name in 2001 to RAC plc. In 1989 he initiated the Lex Report on Motoring (now the RAC Report on Motoring), the most authoritative study of motorists' attitudes in Britain.

He has become a successful entrepreneur. He is Senior Adviser, CVC Capital Partners; Chairman of ITIS plc, a traffic information company; Chairman of Streetcar, the largest UK pay-as-you-go car club, concentrating its operations around London and five other UK cities; Chairman of the Mayor's Fund for London and Chair of the government's Motorists' Forum.

Public roles
Chinn's leadership roles include Chief Barker of the Variety Club of Great Britain for two successive terms (1977 and 1978), Chairman of the Friends of the Duke of Edinburgh's Award Scheme (for which he was appointed CVO in 1989), Vice-Chairman of the Wishing Well Appeal for Great Ormond Street Hospital (for which he received a knighthood in 1990), and Deputy Chairman of the Royal Academy Trust.

Described as a Jewish community grandee, throughout his life he has also devoted himself to the Jewish community in Britain and supporting Israel in a number of roles, for example: chairman and President of the Joint Israel Appeal, the leading organisation in Britain supporting Israel's humanitarian needs; board member of The Jewish Community Centre for London, President of Norwood from 1996 to 2006; one of the founders of the Jewish Association for Business Ethics (and now Vice-President). Sir Trevor currently sits on the Executive Committee of the Jewish Leadership Council and the Britain Israel Communications and Research Centre (BICOM). In 2016, he became President of the Movement for Reform Judaism.

He was Chair of the London Mayor's Fund.

Chinn is a long-time supporter of Labour Friends of Israel. Up to 2016, he donated to the office or campaigns of a number of Labour Party politicians, including MPs Tony Blair, Ruth Smeeth, Liz Kendall, Tom Watson and Dan Jarvis. Since 2016, he has additionally financially supported the MPs Ivan Lewis, Owen Smith, Lisa Nandy, Tristram Hunt, Jack Dromey, Ian Austin, Rachel Reeves , Liam Byrne and Wes Streeting. In February 2020, he donated £50,000 to support the Labour party leadership election campaign of Keir Starmer.

References

1935 births
Alumni of King's College, Cambridge
British businesspeople
British Jews
British philanthropists
Businesspeople awarded knighthoods
Commanders of the Royal Victorian Order
CVC Capital Partners
Knights Bachelor
Living people
People educated at Clifton College
Labour Friends of Israel